Desperados is a collective amusement ride developed by Alterface. It presents itself as an interactive theater with a Western theme.

Principle
10 to 60 riders step on their individual horses and pick up their six-shooters. All riders play together on the same large video screen but everyone receives an individual score and every horse moves differently according to how good its rider plays. Both the best and worst riders are acknowledged by the system via Doc, the 3D character animating the show.

Parks with Desperado attractions
 Happy Valley Shanghai - China
 Rusutsu Resort - Japan
 Bakken - Denmark
 Bobbejaanland - Belgium
 Fraispertuis City - France
 Liseberg - Sweden

External links
 Official website , with video presentation
 Desperados at the Bobbejaanland park (Belgium)
 Desperados at Fraispertuis City (France)
 Desperados at Liseberg (Sweden)

Amusement rides